The Irish Baptist College (IBC) is a Baptist theological college in Moira, Craigavon, Northern Ireland. It is affiliated with the Association of Baptist Churches in Ireland. It is part of the Baptist Theological Centre which is located in the Baptist Centre and is shared with ABC. IBC is accredited and reached Premier College Status by the Accreditation Service for International Colleges (ASIC). The Quality Assurance Agency for Higher Education of England and Wales, review the IBC for quality and standards.

History 
IBC was founded as the Irish Baptist Training Institute, on 4 October 1892 in No. 16 Harcourt St., Dublin, now Republic of Ireland, by Hugh D. Brown, pastor of the neighbouring Harcourt St. Baptist Church, and Ambrose U.G. Bury, MA, was appointed the first principal of the IBC. Since the college was established with funding from the philanthropist J.D. Rockefeller, the building was named Rockefeller House.  The college was controlled half by the Harcourt St. Church and half by the Baptist Union of Ireland. In 1916 Thomas Harold Spurgeon, MA, BD, (son of Rev. Thomas Spurgeon and grandson of Rev. Charles Spurgeon) was appointed principal. In 1940 the College moved to 42 Terenure Road in Dublin, the Harcourt St. Baptist Church had moved to Grosvenor Road, Rathmines. In 1964 the college moved to a new campus in Belfast in Northern Ireland, and control of the college was transferred to the Baptist Association. Following Spurgeon's retirement 1963, David P. Kingdon was appointed principal serving until 1974, when he was succeeded by Dr. Ivor Oakley who served until 1988, Norman Shields served as acting principal following Dr. Oakley's departure. In 1990 Dr. Hamilton Moore became principal serving until 2009 when Edwin Ewart was elected principal. In college accept its first female students in 1964.

On 10 May 2003 the college moved into the purpose built Baptist Theological Centre in the Baptist Centre located outside Lisburn in Moira in County Antrim. A new library (John B. Craig Library) and study area were added in 2010, it is named after Pastor John B. Craig who trained in the IBC in Dublin, before serving in Belfast before emigrating to Canada.

A Women's Ministry Course is run at the Baptist Centre in association with the Irish Baptist College.
The Irish Baptist Historical Society is an extension of the Irish Baptist College.

The IBC became a constituent college of the Institute of Theology at Queen's University Belfast (QUB) in 1977, offering MTh and PhD degrees. In 2003 the IBC began offering undergraduate degrees and an MA validated by the University of Wales, Lampeter (UoW), which ceased its international partnerships programmes in 2010. In 2010 the IBC commenced its partnership with the University of Chester validating Undergraduate and Postgraduate degrees. It was announced in 2019 that QUB was closing the Institute of Theology, with all existing students to have completed their programmes by 2023.

Campus 
IBC is part of the Baptist Theological Centre which is located in the Baptist Centre and is shared with ABC. The campus is in a rural area near to the M1 motorway and within the boundaries of the City of Lisburn. IBC is a campus university.

Organisation 
The Principal of the college is Edwin Ewart, since 2010. The IBC is administered by a management committee which reports to the Association of Baptist Churches in Ireland.

Faculty 
 Pastor Edwin Ewart (BA BD MTh MPhil) became College Principal of IBC in 2010. after being a staff lecturer from April 2007. It was in May 2009, that Pastor Ewart was appointed Principal Designate of the Irish Baptist College, to take up the position of Principal of the Irish Baptist College in 2010. Pastor Ewart is also a Tutor in Pastoral Theology and Biblical Theology. 
Davy Ellison (BD MTh) took up the post of Director of Training in 2019. Prior to lecturing at IBC he was interim co-ordinator for Baptist Youth and assistant pastor at Antrim Baptist church. He lectures in Biblical studies in both the OT and NT.
 Dr. Peter Firth (BD PhD) took up the post of Biblical Studies Tutor (New Testament) in 2010. Prior to lecturing at IBC Peter pastored Charlotte Chapel Edinburgh and Newcastle Baptist Church. 
 Dr. Sarah Darymple (BD PhD) took up the post of Biblical Studies Tutor (Old Testament) in 2014. A former editor of the Baptist Magazine, Sarah also worked as a missionary in France and furthermore as part of a church plant in Scotland.
 Dr. David Luke (BA BD PhD) was employed by the college on a full-time basis in 2013. He is the Postgraduate Director of Studies and the Historical Theology Tutor. David also specialises in Apologetics, a module available to third year students at IBC. Prior to lecturing at IBC David was pastor of Gilnahirk Baptist Church.
 Alan Baird became a staff lecturer in September 2007. Baird is the Ministry Studies Tutor.
 Valerie Hamilton became registrar and a staff lecturer October 2006.
 Ken Scott (MA MLitt PhD) became a staff lecturer in 2007. Scott is the Postgraduate Tutor (part-time).
 Matthew Campbell is the current Youth Ministry lecturer, a role he fulfils alongside working as the Baptist Youth Director.

Courses 
IBC offers degrees accredited by the University of Chester, University of Wales, Lampeter, and IBC awards. Students will complete QUB's courses by 2023 as its Institute of Theology is being wound down.

Sport 
Football and table tennis are both played at IBC. The current IBC table tennis champion is Josh Patterson after his  2-0 defeat of newcomer Andrew Gray, a victory as convincing as it was surprising. 
Former champion- Luke Keys.

See also 
 Association of Baptist Churches in Ireland
 Irish Baptist College Library
 Baptist Centre
 Queen's University Belfast
 University of Chester
 University of Wales, Lampeter

References

External links 
 Irish Baptist College
 Association of Baptist Churches in Ireland
 Queen's University Belfast
 University of Chester
 University of Wales, Lampeter

 
Association of Baptist Churches in Ireland
Baptist seminaries and theological colleges in the United Kingdom
Bible colleges, seminaries and theological colleges in Northern Ireland
Educational institutions established in 1892
Queen's University Belfast
University of Chester
University of Wales, Lampeter
1892 establishments in Ireland